Khar Mazgaon is a village in Raigad district, Maharashtra, India.

Villages in Raigad district